Road No. 1 is a 2010 South Korean television series, starring So Ji-sub, Kim Ha-neul and Yoon Kye-sang. The story revolves around two young soldiers, the woman they both love, and the Korean war that tears all their lives apart. The drama's title, Road No. 1, refers to the route connecting Seoul to Pyongyang, the soldiers' long and brutal road of sacrifice and survival. It aired on MBC from July 23 to August 26, 2010 on Wednesdays and Thursdays at 21:55 for 20 episodes.

Plot
Lee Jang-woo (So Ji-sub) would do anything for his childhood sweetheart Soo-yeon (Kim Ha-neul). When Soo-yeon's family falls on hard times, he joins the army in order to earn money to pay for her tuition. While Jang-woo is on his tour of duty,  Soo-yeon studies hard and spends her time helping injured soldiers as a doctor. She patiently awaits Jang-woo's return, but one day receives word that he has died in combat. Fate brings another man into her life: Shin Tae-ho, a handsome and generous officer who graduated from the army academy at the top of his class. Though she can't forget Jang-woo, Soo-yeon finally decides to leave the past behind her and marry Tae-ho. On the eve of their wedding, Jang-woo suddenly appears again, revealing that the death notice had been a mistake. He had, in fact, been counting the days until he can return home and reunite with his lover. The next morning - June 25, 1950 - the North Korean army invades South Korea, marking the start of the Korean War. With their lives and love already in turmoil, both Jang-woo and Tae-ho are sent north to the battlefield.

Cast
So Ji-sub as Lee Jang-woo 
Kim Ha-neul as Kim Soo-yeon 
Yoon Kye-sang as Shin Tae-ho
Choi Min-soo as Yoon Sam-soo, Commander of the 2nd Company
Son Chang-min as Oh Jong-ki
Kim Jin-woo as Kim Soo-hyuk
Nam Bo-ra as Kim Soo-hee
Julien Kang as U.S. Marine Corps Platoon Leader
Kim Ye-ri as Jo In-sook

Supporting cast

Jin Seon-kyu as Go Man-yong
Lee Kwan-hoon as Kwon Jin-chul
Kim Dong-gon as Kim Duk-shil
Kim Jung-woon as Kim Byung-goo
Park Kwan-shik as Kim Bok-soo
Han Gook-jin as Kim Sang-gook
Cha Hyun-woo as Ma Chang-kil
Min Bok-gi as Park Dal-moon
Oh Dae-hwan as Park Moon-ho
Shin Dam-soo as Lee Geun-bae
Kim Dong-hyun as Jang Doo-shik
Lee Jin-sung as Jo In-kye
 Park Byung-eun as Han Young-min
Noh Young-hak as Heo Chan-shik 
Song Jae-hee as Yang Kang-tae
Kim Gun as Lee Joo-hwan
Jo Wan-ki as Park Hong-ki
Kim Soo-hwan as Woo Bum-jin
Noh Hyung-ok as Young-soo
Yoo Jung-ho as Byun Dae-young
Kim Yoo-jung as young Soo-yeon 
Jung Seung-won as trumpeter
Jang Min-ho as older Jang-woo
Choi Bool-am as older Tae-ho
Shin Hyun-joon as North Korean commissioned officer Jo Sang-wi (cameo)
Lee Chun-hee as soldier in the Youngchongyo bombing  (cameo)
Jung Kyung-ho as man who picks up garbage to sell (cameo)
Hwang Bo-ra as girl from Jong-ki's hometown (cameo)
Oh Man-seok as North Korean soldier (cameo)
Moon Chae-won as female soldier taking care of older Jang-woo (cameo)
Kim Yeo-jin as wife of soldier in squad 2 (cameo)
Jung So-young as (cameo)

Soundtrack
 Even Becoming the Wild - Hwanhee
 Even If the World Separates Us - Wheesung
 Because I'm a Woman - IU
 Same Heart - Baek Ji-young
 Idly - Naomi
 Only You - Kim Jin-woo
 The Sound of Memory - So Ji-sub
 Youngchonmyeon - Kim Hyo-soo
 Call of Korean (Inst.) - Hwang Sang-jun
 Action No. 1 (Inst.) - Ryu Hyung-wook
 A Flower On the Ruins (Inst.) - Noh Hyung-woo
 Victory (Inst.) - Hwang Sang-jun
 Battlefield (Inst.) - Noh Hyung-woo
 Jang-woo's Theme (Inst.) - Hwang Sang-jun
 Who Wanted This War? (Inst.) - Ryu Hyung-wook
 Requiem (Inst.) - Hwang Sang-jun
 Even Becoming the Wild (Guitar Version) - Hwanhee
 Even If the World Separates Us (Piano Version) - Wheesung
 Because I'm a Woman (Piano Version) - IU
 Same Heart (Humming Version) - Baek Ji-young

Special Bonus:
Call of Korean (TV Version) - Various Artists

Production
This was So Ji-sub and Kim Ha-neul's first acting collaboration after they were paired in a commercial shoot for fashion brand Storm in 1997. It was also Kim and Yoon Kye-sang's onscreen reunion following the 2008 film Lovers of Six Years.

In preparation for their roles, the lead actors underwent military training with Korea's Fifth Division Army.

Reception
Expectations were high for the  big-budget war epic, and it was sold to Japan before it premiered in Korea. But the series did not achieve high ratings, averaging 6% for its run.

Ratings

References

External links
  
 Road No. 1 at MBC Global Media
 
 

2010 South Korean television series debuts
2010 South Korean television series endings
MBC TV television dramas
Korean-language television shows
South Korean action television series
South Korean romance television series
South Korean military television series
Television series by Logos Film